This list includes individuals who served in the Special Air Service (SAS) – (Regular or TA).

Alf Dignum - 1st SAS (WW2)
Michael Asher - Author, Historian and Desert Explorer
Sir Peter de la Billière - Commander-in-Chief British Forces in the Gulf War
Julian Brazier TD - MP for Canterbury
Charles "Nish" Bruce QGM - Freefall expert
Charles R. Burton - Explorer
Frank Collins - First soldier to enter the building in the Iranian Embassy Siege
Tim Collins - Author
James Condon - Indo-Malayan campaign casualty
Jeffrey Cook - Director for Security Liaison in the Royal Household
Cedric Delves - Lieutenant General
Arthur Denaro
Nick Downie - TV War correspondent
David Eyton-Jones
Sir Ranulph Fiennes OBE – Adventurer
Rusty Firmin - Author
John Paul Foley - Former director of intelligence
Terry Forrestal - Stuntman
Gavin Hamilton MC
Jon Hollingsworth CGC QGM
Ronald G Williams DSO - Commander of the SAS Troop at the Battle of Churchill
Talaiasi 'Laba' Labalaba - BEM, MID, Battle of Mirbat participant
Michael Patrick 'Bronco' Lane MM BEM -  Author and mountaineer
Lofty Large - Author
Jock Lewes - Co-founder of the regiment
Arthur Denaro
Jamie Lowther-Pinkerton MVO MBE - Private Secretary to  Prince William and Prince Harry
Simon Mann - Mercenary, Equatorial Guinea
Paddy Mayne, DSO*** - British and Irish Lions Rugby Union player
Fitzroy Maclean
John McAleese - First man on the balcony during the Iranian Embassy siege in 1980 caught on live news. Team member for the BBC Television series SAS Survival Secrets
Peter McAleese - Former Mercenary and Author
Andy McNab DCM MM - Author
Des Peter Middleton, 1st SAS WW2, mentioned by Ian Wellsted in two of his books website http://peejay537.wixsite.com/middleton-sas
Danny Nightingale
Peter Oldfield – cricketer
Lewis Pugh OIG - environmental campaigner and swimmer
Peter Ratcliffe DCM MID - Author
Ronald Reid-Daly - Selous Scouts founder
John Ridgway - Record breaking Sailor
Michael Rose KCB CBE DSO QGM
Anthony Royle, Baron Fanshawe of Richmond - Former MP
Chris Ryan MM - Author
Bill Kennedy Shaw - Intelligence officer with the SAS during World War II
Oliver Shepard - Explorer
Al Slater MM
John Slim, 2nd Viscount Slim
Phil Stant - Professional footballer
David Stirling OBE DSO - Founder of the Regiment
Tip Tipping - Stuntman
Richard Tomlinson - Secret Intelligence Service
Steve Truglia - Stuntman
John "Lofty" Wiseman (Regimental Sergeant Major)
Johnny Wiseman MC (WWII)
John Woodhouse, commander and founder of the SAS's modern selection system
Louis Rudd - Explorer, Second to ski solo across Antarctica
Trooper Austin Fuzz Hussey also served at Mirbat.
Mark 'Billy' Billingham - SAS: Who Dares Wins
Bear Grylls - Television host, was the youngest Briton to climb Mount Everest
John V. - also served in Military Assist command

References

Signaler Sgt Kit Foster MM

Special Air Service